The Waldo J. Wood Memorial High School, formerly referred to as Oakland City Wood Memorial High School by the IHSAA, now simply as Wood Memorial High School is a public education institution located in Oakland City, Indiana, USA, serving the East Gibson School Corporation and drawing students from Barton, Center and Columbia Townships in the much more sparsely populated eastern third of Gibson County, Indiana. As such, Wood Memorial is the smallest high school in county, being roughly half the sizes of either Gibson Southern or Princeton Community.

Athletics
The school is in the Indiana High School Athletic Association class A with around 400 students in grades 9–12. The school colors are green, white and gold and the mascots are the Trojans and Lady Trojans. Since 2002, the school has been a member of the Blue Chip Conference, and more recently, the Southwest Seven Football Conference, although previously it was a member of the Pocket Athletic Conference (Two of its predecessor schools, Oakland City High School and Francisco High School were early members of the conference) along with its county rival Gibson Southern (Two of GS's predecessors were also members).
Sports offered at Wood Memorial include:

Boys
Soccer
Tennis
Basketball
Wrestling
Track
Golf
Baseball
No football

Girls
Soccer
Tennis
Volleyball
Basketball
Swimming
Track
Softball
Cheerleading
Cross Country

See also
 List of high schools in Indiana

References

External links

 Official website
 Public School Review – Wood Memorial HS
 School Tree.org – Wood Memorial HS
 Wood Memorial's Indiana Department of Education profile
 East Gibson School Corporation website

High schools in Southwestern Indiana
Oakland City, Indiana
Pocket Athletic Conference
Blue Chip Conference
Schools in Gibson County, Indiana
Public high schools in Indiana
Public middle schools in Indiana
1967 establishments in Indiana